Rathika Ramasamy is an Indian wildlife photographer. She is based in Chennai and operates as a freelance photographer. She has received many accolades for her photographs and has been called the "first Indian woman to strike an international reputation as a wildlife photographer".

Biography
[[File:Malabar grey hornbill.jpg|right|thumb|Malabar grey hornbill (Ocyceros griseus'''), a Western Ghat endemic bird]]

Rathika has lived in New Delhi since 1999, after her marriage. She has a degree in computer engineering and an MBA, and worked as a software engineering for several years before becoming a full-time photographer.

Rathika received her first camera from her uncle, an amateur photographer himself, and began shooting pictures of trees and flowers. In 2003 she visited the Keoladeo National Park in Bharatpur and took pictures of birds.  She began visiting the Okhla Bird Sanctuary regularly, studying the behaviour of various types of birds. Thereafter, she took to wildlife photography as her professional interest and visited many national parks in India, Kenya, and Tanzania.

Her wildlife photography was featured at the "Clean Ganga Campaign" held in September 2005 at the India International Centre, New Delhi. In 2007, the Jawaharlal Nehru University's annual calendar featured her bird photographs. The "Birds of India" chose her as one of the Top 20 best photographers of India in 2008, the only woman to receive the distinction. Besides participating in wildlife exhibitions, she conducts workshops on wildlife photography.

Rathika is among the founding members of the Photography Arts Association of India.

Works
Rathika self-published her first book, The Best of Wildlife Moments'', in 2014.

Awards
2015: Inspiring Icon Award, Sathyabama University, Chennai
2015: International Camera Fair (ICF) award, for her excellence in wildlife photography.

See also
List of Indian women artists

References

Living people
Indian women photographers
Indian wildlife photographers
People from Theni district
Women artists from Tamil Nadu
20th-century Indian photographers
21st-century Indian photographers
20th-century Indian women artists
Indian women environmentalists
21st-century Indian women artists
Year of birth missing (living people)
Photographers from Tamil Nadu
20th-century women photographers
21st-century women photographers